Hiram na Mukha is a 1992 Filipino film directed by Joel Lamangan based on the Komiks story of the same name written by Pablo S. Gomez. The film stars Nanette Medved, Christopher de Leon and Cesar Montano in his first ever starring role in a Viva Films production.

In 2007, it was adapted into a TV drama series.

Plot 
Famous plastic surgeon Dr. Hugo (Christopher de Leon) has a fiancée Alicia (Nanette Medved) and feels that her face is his greatest creation. Originally a monstrous carnival attraction, she was transformed into a beautiful and glamorous woman through surgery. Alicia learns that beauty is not everything that she imagined it to be. She finds it difficult to discern whether people like her for her personality or only because she is rich and beautiful. She yearns for her former self, the ugly Carissa. As Carissa, she felt sure that those who liked her were not attracted by her appearance. One such person was her former neighbor and lover, Mendez (Cesar Montano).

Mendez is actually Hugo's grandson. He and Alicia rekindle their relationship. The lovers conceive a scheme to scam the great doctor out of his fortune. The plan calls for Alicia to wed Hugo and convince him to transfer his fortune to her. Then Mendez will murder his grandfather and the lovers will live happily ever after. They have an even more diabolical plan.

Cast of characters

 Nanette Medved as Carissa / Alicia
 Christopher de Leon as Dr. Hugo Roldan
 Cesar Montano as Mendez
 Maritoni Fernandez as Morita
 Daria Ramirez as Timotea
 Dante Rivero as Kardo
 Caridad Sanchez as Lola Emma
 Cherry Pie Picache as Shirley
 Rosemarie Gil as Tita Rose
 Lucita Soriano as Aling Azon
 Lorli Villanueva as Kapitana
 Romeo Rivera as Miguel
 Celso Ad Castillo as Recruiter
 Orestes Ojeda as Dr. Ruben Victorino
 Melissa Mendez as Margot Victorino

Komiks origin 
Hiram na Mukha was first serialized in Komiks before becoming a film. Pablo S. Gomez was the creator and writer of the story. However, all the rights were transferred to Viva Films.

Music
Ella Mae Saison performed the movie's theme song, "Hiram na Sandali".

TV series 

In 2007, Hiram na Mukha was remade as a TV series starring Heart Evangelista as Alicia/Carissa. It was the second installment of Sineserye Presents.

Awards and nominations

See also
Hiram na Mukha (TV series)

References

External links 
 

Philippine drama films
Tagalog-language films
1992 films
Philippine films based on comics
Films based on Philippine comics
Live-action films based on comics
Films directed by Joel Lamangan